The National Academy of Arts is an institution of higher education in Sofia, Bulgaria. It is the oldest and most renowned school of arts in the country.

History

The National Academy of Arts was founded in 1896 by noted artists and public figures such as Ivan Mrkvička, Anton Mitov, and sculptor Boris Schatz, as well as  men of letters in the likes of Konstantin Velichkov and Ivan Shishmanov. The original faculty also included Czech painter Jaroslav Věšín.

The National Academy of Arts' main edifice was built in 1906 after a project by Alexander Smirnov, the construction being guided by F. Schwanberg.

Renowned painter Nikola Marinov served as Chancellor in the period 1935-1937 and was a professor between 1921 and 1940.

Structure
Over 1,000 students are being educated at the academy in various art subjects, including 130 foreign students and 35 future doctors. The institution is divided into two faculties: Faculty of Fine Arts and Faculty of Applied Arts.

Notable alumni

Ilia Beshkov 
Vladimir Dimitrov
Vasil Dokev
Dionisii Donchev 
Donyo Donev 
Christo Vladimirov Javacheff
Stefan Kanchev 
Ivan Gekoff 
Ida Ivanka Kubler
Yoan Leviev
Violeta Maslarova
Angel Metodiev 
Svetlana Mircheva
Alzek Misheff 
Vera Nedkova
Ivan Nenov 
Nikolai Rainov 
Sencer Sari
Alexander Telalim
Krassimir Terziev 
Yanko Tihov
Shmuel Ben David
Theodore Ushev
Stefan Valev
Daria Vassilyanska
Keraca Visulčeva

References

External links
 NAA website (in Bulgarian and English)

Universities and colleges in Sofia
1896 establishments in Bulgaria
Educational institutions established in 1896